The 1977–78 Liga Leumit season saw Maccabi Netanya win the title, while Hakoah Ramat Gan and Hapoel Acre were relegated to Liga Artzit. David Lavi of Maccabi Netanya was the league's top scorer with 17 goals.

The following season, the league was expanded to 16 clubs.

Final table

Results

References
Israel - List of final tables RSSSF

Liga Leumit seasons
Israel
1977–78 in Israeli football leagues